The buff ermine (Spilarctia luteum) is a moth of the family Erebidae. It is sometimes placed in the genus Spilosoma. The species was first described by Johann Siegfried Hufnagel in 1766. It is found throughout the temperate belt of the Palearctic region south to northern Turkey, Georgia, Kazakhstan, southern Siberia (excluding Buryatia), eastern Mongolia, Amur Region, China, Korea and Japan.

The wings of this species are buffish yellow (the males tend to be more yellow than the females) and are typically marked with a diagonal row of dark spots on the forewing and a few other scattered spots on both forewings and hindwings. The extent of black markings varies considerably, however, from almost spotless examples to largely black melanic forms. The wingspan is 34–42 mm. The species flies from May to July in the British Isles. This may vary in other parts of the range. It is attracted to light.

The larva is pale brown and very hairy. It is polyphagous, feeding on a wide variety of trees, shrubs and herbaceous plants (see list). This species overwinters as a pupa.

Recorded food plants
Some larval food plants include:

Alnus – alder
Mentha – mint
Plantago – plantain
Quercus – oak
Rheum – rhubarb
Ribes – currant
Rubus – raspberry
Rumex – dock/sorrel
Senecio – ragwort
Urtica – nettle
Lonicera – honeysuckle
Humulus  – hops

Subspecies
Spilarctia lutea lutea
Spilarctia lutea adzharica Dubatolov, 2007 (Georgia)
Spilarctia lutea japonica (Rothschild, 1910) (Middle Amur, Primorye, southern Sakhalin, southern Kuril Islands, eastern China, Korea, Japan)
Spilarctia lutea rhodosoma (Turati, 1907) Sicily, the black of the upperside is increased by a larger number of the spots; but especially distinguished by the bright red abdomen.

Gallery

References and notes

External links

Hlasek, Josef Lubomir "Spilosoma luteum ab6369". Photo Gallery Wildlife Pictures.

Spilosoma lutea at EoL

"10566 Spilarctia lutea (Hufnagel, 1766) - Gelber Fleckleibbär". Lepiforum e.V.. Retrieved September 28, 2019.

Spilarctia
Moths described in 1766
Moths of Asia
Moths of Europe
Taxa named by Johann Siegfried Hufnagel